Ginásio Teixeirinha is an indoor sporting arena located in Passo Fundo, Brazil.  The capacity of the arena is 10,000 spectators.  It hosts indoor sporting events such as basketball and volleyball, and also hosts concerts.

External links
Stadium information

Indoor arenas in Brazil
Sports venues in Rio Grande do Sul